Dathan James Ritzenhein (born December 30, 1982) is a retired American long-distance runner, and current head coach of On Athletics Club. He held the American record in the 5,000 metres (12:56.27) from 2009-2010, when it was broken by Bernard Lagat. He is a three-time national cross country champion with wins at the USA Cross Country Championships in 2005, 2008 and 2010. Formerly a Nike athlete for the majority of his professional career, Dathan joined the Hansons-Brooks Distance Project team in 2017.  In early May 2020, he announced his retirement from competition.  He signed with the Swiss shoe brand On shortly thereafter in June 2020 and currently acts as the coach for the OAC (On Athletics Club) in Boulder, Colorado.

Ritzenhein was a standout runner at Rockford High School in Michigan and the University of Colorado at Boulder. He was part of the stellar high school class of 2001 that also produced American high school and overall mile record holder Alan Webb and American half-marathon and marathon record holder Ryan Hall.

Running career

High school

Ritzenhein ("Ritz") emerged as a cult figure among high school track fans during his junior and senior years at Rockford High School, especially since he graduated from high school in the same year as Alan Webb and Ryan Hall, America's other budding distance prodigies.  He set numerous state and national high school records during this time, notably in the 1600m (4:05.9) 3200m (8:41.10) and in the 5000m (13:44.70).  He won back-to-back regional (Midwest) and national titles in the Foot Locker high school championship races in the fall of 1999 and 2000.  There was major build-up to the 2000 championships due to the impending clash between Ritz, Webb, and Hall.  Ritz scored a resounding victory over Webb and Hall in Orlando, Florida, running the 5k course in 14:35. Perhaps more impressive, the previous year he claimed an unexpected national title while setting the course record in 14:29.
As a senior in high school he set the Michigan high school 5k record of 14:10 at state finals; second place was 15:05.
His final cross country race in high school was at the IAAF junior world cross-country championships in Ostend Belgium where he won a bronze medal.

Collegiate

Ritzenhein began to attend the University of Colorado at Boulder in the fall of 2001 to major in history and compete intercollegiately in cross country and track.  During his first cross country season he finished in fourth place at the NCAA Cross Country Championships with a time of 29:11.  His finish along with the second-place finish of teammate Jorge Torres helped lead Colorado to the team title.  The following spring he competed in the 5000 m race at the NCAA Track and Field Outdoor Championships, finishing again in fourth place with a 14:01.02.  His 5000 personal record during that season was 13:27.77. Stress fractures caused him to decide to redshirt his sophomore year in both cross country and track.  In the fall of 2003, Ritzenhein once again competed in cross country.  He won the Big 12 title, and then outkicked Ryan Hall of Stanford to win the NCAA Cross Country Championships individual title.  His winning time was 29:14.1.  In the spring of 2004 Ritzenhein ran a 27:38.50 in his debut at 10,000 m at Stanford.  The next day he won the 5000 m at the Big 12 Outdoor Conference Championships.  Ritzenhein concluded his collegiate season by placing second to Robert Cheseret of Arizona in the 5000 m at the NCAA Outdoor Track and Field Championships.  Ritzenhein harbored hopes of competing in the Olympic Games at the end of the summer in Athens, but shortly after the NCAA meet he developed a stress fracture in his foot.  He limped through the Olympic Trials in the 10,000 m, finishing last, but was able to make the team because the two other athletes with Olympic qualifying times did not go to Athens, Bob Kennedy having dropped out of the Olympic Trials race with an Achilles tendon injury and Meb Keflezighi choosing to focus solely on the marathon.  Ritzenhein ran the Olympic 10,000 m, but dropped out mid-race due to pain caused by his stress fracture.  Shortly after the Olympics he decided to forgo his remaining collegiate eligibility in order to run professionally.  At this time he changed coaches from Mark Wetmore to Brad Hudson.

Post-collegiate/professional
Ritzenhein began his professional career on December 31, 2004, when he finished 3rd in a 10 km road race in Italy. In January 2005 he won the prestigious Belfast International cross country race, and seemed to be in great form. Ritzenhein won the U.S. Cross Country Championships in the 12 km for his first senior national title. Before the World Cross Country Championships expectations were high and some prognosticators even predicted a top 10 finish, but Ritzenhein faded after going out with the leaders and ended up placing 62nd. Ritzenhein's 2005 track season began with a 13:22.23 5000m personal record and a 7:43.95 3000m. In a much anticipated 2 mile race that included high school rival Alan Webb, Ritzenhein ran 8:23.45, which was a solid performance, but was overshadowed by Webb's 8:11.48 for the American record (the next year, they would switch times). A few days before the U.S. Outdoor Track Championships Ritzenhein injured a nerve on his foot while kicking around a soccer ball bare foot with his dog. This injury effectively ended his season.

On February 19, 2006, Ritzenhein faltered in the USATF national cross-country championships at Van Cortlandt Park. Leading with Hall and Jorge Torres for several circuits of the 12K course, he dropped off badly near the end as Ryan Hall ran away from the field. Ritzenhein finished nearly a minute behind Hall and finished fourth in the race. He qualified for the team but appeared to be hurting badly after the race, leading some to question his fitness heading into the IAAF World Cross-Country Championships April 1–2. Ritzenhein was diagnosed with walking pneumonia after the USATF national cross-country championships and forfeited his spot on the US team.

He again competed against Alan Webb in a 10,000 meter race at the Cardinal Invitational at Stanford University on April 30, 2006. Prior to the race Webb and Ritzenhein agreed to alternate leading the race for the first 24 laps. The last lap would be "every man for himself." Webb's mid-distance background allowed him to outkick Ritzenhein for the win, 27:34.72 to 27:35.65, a personal best for both runners. In the 5000 m at the U.S. Outdoor Track Championships Ritzenhein finished 3rd behind Bernard Lagat and Matt Tegenkamp. Ritzenhein's time of 13:16.61 was a personal record. He then went to Europe and ran two 5000 m races. He won his first race in Switzerland, and then ran respectably in an elite field in Rome.

Ritzenhein made his Marathon debut in the 2006 ING New York City Marathon, finishing in 11th place with a time of 2:14:01.

Ritzenhein finished second (2:11:07) in the 2008 Olympic Marathon Trials which automatically placed Dathan on Team USA for the Beijing Olympics.

In the 2008 Olympic Marathon, Ritzenhein was the first American Runner to cross the finish line, finishing 9th with a time of 2:11:59. His teammate, Ryan Hall, finished just behind him in 10th place.

In January 2009, Ritzenhein placed 2nd at the U.S. Half Marathon Championship. Three months later, he set a personal best at the 2009 London Marathon, finishing 11th in 2:10:00.

In May 2009, Ritzenhein and longtime coach Brad Hudson parted ways. He moved from Eugene to Portland, Oregon in order to train with Alberto Salazar's Nike Oregon Project.

On August 17, 2009, Ritzenhein placed 6th in the 10,000 metres at the World Championships in Berlin, Germany. He set a personal best of 27:22.28 in that race.

Just eleven days later at the Weltklasse Meeting in Zurich, Switzerland, Ritzenhein placed 3rd in the 5,000 metres, setting a new American record with a time of 12:56.27. He became just the third American to run under 13 minutes in the 5,000, as well as the third fastest non-African of all time in that event behind Dieter Baumann and Craig Mottram.

At the Half Marathon Championships, in Birmingham, Ritzenhein placed third with a time of 60:00. That time is the second fastest American time ever just behind Ryan Hall's 59:43. Ritzenhein finished just one second behind the second-place finisher. With his 1-hour and 25 second personal best time, Dathan became the first American to go home with a medal from these World Championships.

In the January 2012 Olympic Marathon Trials, Ritzenhein ran a personal best 2:09:55, but placed 4th, narrowly missing a spot on the US Marathon Team by eight seconds behind the third-place finisher Abdi Abdirahman.

On the evening of June 22, 2012, Ritzenhein placed third in the US Olympic Trials in the 10K run and successfully achieved the Olympic 'A' standard of 27:45.00. Conditions were extremely rainy and cold, and he had not yet achieved the Olympic 'A' standard before the race. He and his teammate and training partner, Galen Rupp, worked together to pace the race for the first 5000 meters, with Rupp pulling away to win it in the final three laps.

On August 4, 2012, at the 2012 London Olympics, Ritzenhein finished 13th in the 10,000 m finals with a time of 27:45:89 behind winner Mo Farah (27:30:42) and second-place finisher Galen Rupp (27:30:90). After the Olympics he ran at the Philadelphia Half Marathon and came third, running a time of 1:00:57 – the fastest by an American that year. A fast finish at the 2012 Chicago Marathon saw him move up into ninth place, the fastest non-African runner, and set a new personal record of 2:07:47 hours.

On February 13, 2016, Ritz dropped out at the 2016 US Olympic Marathon Trials.

Ritzenhein retired from professional running in May 2020. In an interview with Flotrack, he reminisced memories of his 16 year career. He stated that "I guess I'm not necessarily 25 and retiring in my prime. I have things that I wish that I have done in my career, but I'm also very satisfied, too. I think right now it's something that I thought a lot about the last year. I've had a lot of nostalgic moments, looking back a lot more than looking forward. So, I don't know that I had a lot more goals that I was looking to accomplish."

Coaching
On May 9, 2014, Ritzenhein announced that he would leave the Nike Oregon Project to move closer to his hometown of Grand Rapids, Michigan. He was sponsored by Brooks. Dathan plans to continue coaching; he hopes to attract talent to Grand Valley State University in Michigan.

Ritzenhein is currently head coach of On Athletic Club based in Boulder, containing athletes such as Ollie Hoare and Morgan McDonald and Geordie Beamish.

High Altitude Training
Dathan regularly trains at St-Moritz, Switzerland at 1800m above sea-level, to prepare for his major competitions.

Motorsport
Ritzenhein is also interested in motorsports, and has prepared to be a racing car driver (including the Le Mans 24 hour race) after concluding his racing career.

Personal
Ritzenhein is married to Rockford native and former University of Colorado distance runner Kalin Toedebusch. The two have a daughter Addison (2008) and a son Jude (2011).

Achievement chronology
1999 - Foot Locker national high school cross-country champion; Nike Outdoor Nationals 2 mile champion
2000 - Foot Locker national high school cross-country champion; Nike Outdoor Nationals 2 mile champion
2001 - IAAF World Junior Cross-Country Championships bronze medalist
2001 - 4th place at NCAA Cross-Country Championships
2003 - NCAA 5,000 m runner-up to Robert Cheseret
2003 - NCAA and Big 12 cross-country champion while at the University of Colorado at Boulder
2003 - USTFCCCA NCAA Division I National Cross Country Athlete of the Year
2004 - Athens Olympics qualifier for the United States in the 10,000 m race
2005 - USATF 12k cross-country champion
2005 - Winner of the Belfast International Cross-Country
2006 - 4th place at the Edinburgh Cross-Country, defeating Serhiy Lebid and Alistair Cragg
2006 - 11th place at the ING New York City Marathon. 2:14:01
2007 - 3rd place at the U.S. Cross Country Championships
2007 - 9th place 10,000 m at IAAF World Championships in Osaka, Japan
2007 - 2nd place at the U.S. Olympic Marathon Team Trials, qualifying for the Beijing Olympics
2008 - 1st place at the U.S. Cross Country Championships.
2008 - 9th place, 1st American, at the Men's Olympic Marathon in Beijing, China, with a time of 2:11:59.
2009 - 2nd place at the U.S. Half Marathon Championships.
2009 - 11th place, 2nd American, at the 2009 Flora London Marathon
2009 - 2nd place, 10000m, USA Outdoor Championships, 27:58.59
2009 - 6th place, 10000m, at IAAF World Championships in Berlin, Germany
2009 - 3rd place, 5000m, at IAAF Golden League Meet in Zurich, Switzerland, setting the American Record in the 5000m of 12:56.27.
2009 - 3rd place, half marathon, at IAAF World Half Marathon Championships, running the 2nd fastest time by an American with a time of 60:00.
2010 - 1st place, 12000m, USATF Cross country Championships, won with a time of 34:34.
2010 - 8th place at the ING New York City Marathon. 2:12:33
2012 - 4th place at the U.S. Olympic Marathon Team Trials (announces semi-retirement from the marathon for the time being)
2012 - 3rd place at the U.S. Olympic Team Trials (10,000m), qualifying for the London Olympics
2012 - 13th place, 10000m, at the London Olympics. 27 minutes, 45.89 seconds
2012 - 9th place, 1st American, Bank of America Chicago Marathon, 2:07:47
2013 - 2nd place, 10000m, USA Outdoor Championships, 28:49.66, qualifying for the 2013 World Championships in Athletics
2013 - 5th place, 1st American, Bank of America Chicago Marathon, 2:09:45
2015 - 7th place, 1st American, Boston Marathon, 2:11:20
2015 - 3rd place, beating Luke Puskedra and Tyler Pennel, U.S. 20 km road Championship
2016 - Did not Finish, U.S. Olympic Marathon Trials. 2nd place at Great North Run, missing his 7 year old P.R. by only 12 seconds, finishing 8 seconds behind Mo Farah in 1:00:12, September 11, 2016.
2017 - 1st place at the Fifth Third River Bank Run 25K, finishing at 1:14:27 with a pace of 4:48 per mile. Half Marathon time of 1:02:30.

Personal best times
 1,500 m - 3:42.99 (2002)
 3,000 m – 7:39.03  (2007)
 2 miles - 8:11.74 (2007)
 5,000 m - 12:56.27 (2009) (former American Record)
 10,000 m - 27:22.28  (2009)
 Half-Marathon - 1:00:00 (2009)
 Marathon - 2:07:47 (2012)

References

External links
 
 
 
 
 
 
 New Yorker profile of Ritzenheim and Coach Alberto Salazar

1982 births
Living people
Sportspeople from Grand Rapids, Michigan
Track and field athletes from Michigan
American male long-distance runners
American male marathon runners
Olympic track and field athletes of the United States
Athletes (track and field) at the 2004 Summer Olympics
Athletes (track and field) at the 2008 Summer Olympics
Athletes (track and field) at the 2012 Summer Olympics
Colorado Buffaloes men's cross country runners
Colorado Buffaloes men's track and field athletes